Bedřich "Frederick" Tintner (15 June 1912 – 19 March 2015) was a Czech-British soldier. He escaped the Gestapo during the World War II and served in the British, Czech and Soviet armed forces. He took part in the Battle of the Dukla Pass. Tintner's parents, sister, and a brother, along with many other relatives, all were murdered in the Auschwitz concentration camp. Tintner married a woman named Ruth in Norwich on 27 February 1943. After the war, Tintner and his family settled in Denham, England, where he started a textile import business. He became a British citizen in 1948. He died on 19 March 2015 at the age of 102.

Military career 
In September 1944 Soviet forces began a campaign to take over Czechoslovakia from the Germans. Serving in the 1st Czechoslovak Army Corps (Commanded by General and future  president of Czechoslovakia Ludvík Svoboda); and fought in the Battle of Dukla Pass. By October of the same year; Tintner became in charge of the 1st Bn Czechoslovak Brigade.

References

External links 
http://schoenberg.com/WebTree/pc53/pc53_038.htm

1912 births
2015 deaths
Czech military personnel
Czech Jews
People from Nový Jičín
British businesspeople
Naturalised citizens of the United Kingdom
British centenarians
Czech centenarians
Men centenarians
Czechoslovak emigrants to the United Kingdom